Sleiman is an alternative spelling for Suleiman (in Arabic name ). It  means "man of peace". It may refer to:

Persons

Given name
Sleiman Frangieh, also known as Suleiman Frangieh (1910–1992), President of Lebanon from 1970 to 1976
Sleiman Hajjar (1950–2002), the Melkite Catholic bishop of Canada
Sleiman Mhanna, Senior Research Fellow at the University of Melbourne

Mononym
Sleiman (rapper), Danish rapper

Surname
Ali Sleiman (born 1947), Lebanese fencer
Haaz Sleiman, American actor originally from Lebanon
Michel Sleiman, also known as Michel Suleiman, (born 1948), the President of Lebanon
Rola Sleiman (born c. 1975), Lebanese-Syrian pastor
Samir Sleiman, Liberal Party of Canada candidate, 2008 Canadian federal election
Wafaa Sleiman (born 1952), the First Lady of Lebanon (since 2008), wife of President Michel Sleiman

See also 
Islamic view of Solomon
Slimane
Soliman (disambiguation)
Solomon
Sulaiman (disambiguation)
Sulayman
Suleiman (disambiguation)
Suleimani (disambiguation)
Sulejman
Suleman (disambiguation)
Suleyman
Süleymanoğlu
Sulliman

de:Sleiman